ŽKK Čelik Zenica is a women's basketball club from Zenica, Bosnia and Herzegovina.

Honours

Domestic
National Championships – 3

Bosnian League:
Winner (3) : 2012, 2014, 2015
Runners-up (3) : 2010, 2011, 2017
3rd place (1) : 2020

National Cups – 5

Bosnian Cup
Winner (5) : 2011, 2012, 2014, 2015, 2016
Runners-up (2) : 2006, 2017, 2020

External links
 
Profile at eurobasket.com

 

Sport in Zenica
Basketball teams established in 1998
Women's basketball teams in Bosnia and Herzegovina